Lalita Sehrawat (born 14 June 1994) is an Indian wrestler. She represented India in the women's freestyle 53 kg category at the 2014 Commonwealth Games in Glasgow in which she won the silver medal.

References

Living people
1994 births
Indian female sport wrestlers
Sportswomen from Haryana
People from Hisar district
Wrestlers at the 2014 Commonwealth Games
Commonwealth Games silver medallists for India
Commonwealth Games medallists in wrestling
21st-century Indian women
21st-century Indian people
Female sport wrestlers from Haryana
Asian Wrestling Championships medalists
Medallists at the 2014 Commonwealth Games